Smithophis is a genus of snakes in the subfamily Natricinae of the family Colubridae; the one species that was known prior to 2019 had been classified under the genus Rhabdops, but was removed in the process of erecting the new genus Smithophis. The genus is endemic to Asia. It is named for Malcolm Arthur Smith, a British herpetologist who was active in Indian herpetology.

Species of Smithophis
The following species are recognized as being valid:

Smithophis arunachalensis  – Arunachal rain snake, black and yellow smithophis
Smithophis atemporalis  – Mizo rain snake, narrow-headed smithophis
Smithophis bicolor  –  brown trapezoid snake, two-colored forest snake
Smithophis linearis  –  Jingpo mountain stream snake, lined smithophis

Nota bene: A binomial authority in parentheses indicates that the species was originally described in a genus other than Smithophis.

References

 
Snake genera
Taxa named by Veerappan Deepak